Maude Comstock Waitt (1875-1935) was a member of the Ohio Senate. She was one of the first six women elected into the Ohio General Assembly in 1922. She sponsored 3 bills in 1923, all of which passed in both the Senate and the House of Representatives. She was reelected in 1924, 1926, and 1928.

Waitt died in her sleep on December 13, 1935 after a long illness.

References

External links
Profile on the Ohio Ladies' Gallery website
Maude C. Waitt media collection at the Ohio Channel

Republican Party members of the Ohio House of Representatives
Women state legislators in Ohio
1875 births
1935 deaths